Codex Boreelianus, Codex Boreelianus Rheno-Trajectinus (full name), designated by Fe or 09 in the Gregory-Aland numbering and ε 86 in von Soden numbering, is a 9th (or 10th) century uncial manuscript of the four Gospels in Greek. The manuscript, written on parchment, is full of lacunae (or gaps), many of which arose between 1751 and 1830. The codex was named Boreelianus after Johannes Boreel (1577–1629), who brought it from the East.

The text of the codex represents the majority of the text (Byzantine text-type), but with numerous alien readings (non-Byzantine). Some of its readings do not occur in any other manuscript (so called singular readings). According to the present textual critics its text is not a very important manuscript, but it is quoted in all modern editions of the Greek New Testament.

The manuscript was brought from the East at the beginning of the 17th century. It was in private hands for over 100 years. Since 1830 it has been housed at the Utrecht University.

Description 
The codex contains the text of the four Gospels, on 204 parchment leaves of size , with numerous lacunae (or gaps). The text of the existing codex begins with Matthew 9:1 and ends with John 13:34. Luke is even more incomplete. In 1751 Wettstein remarked that the codex started at Matthew 7:6 and that only the folia with Matthew 8:25 and Mark 11:6–16 were missing. It means that in his time the manuscript was far more complete than at present. At present, lacunae of the manuscript include:

 Matthew 1:1–9:1; 12:1–44; 13:55–14:9; 15:20–31; 20:18–21:5;
 Mark 1:43–2:8; 2:23–3:5; 11:6–26; 14:54–15:5; 15:39–16:19;
 Luke – at least 24 gaps (according to Scrivener); Based on the CSNTM text tags 1:10-40; 2:14-3:1; 3:22-4:7; 5:13-29; 6:1-7:7; 7:27-36; 8:7-14, 33-50; 9:7-25, 31, 35-43; 9:55-10:12; 10:15-16, 18, 22-33; 11:23-12:5; 12:23; 12:28-13:13; 13:25-14:17; 14:29-15:4; 15:11-12; 15:15-16:2; 17:15-18:13; 18:29-40; 19:37-20:11; 20:22-21:27; 22:4-5, 9, 12, 16, 41; 22:43-23:10; 23:37-50; 24:4, 20-43.
 John 3:5–14; 4:23–38; 5:18–38; 6:39–63; 7:28–8:10; 10:32–11:3; 12:14–25; 13:34-end.

The leaves are unbound and are kept in loose quires. The text is written in late uncial script, in two columns per page, with mostly 19 lines per column, in large uncial letters. Palaeographically the writing is close to the Codex Seidelianus I.

The letters Η, Μ, Ν, and Π, are square, the letters Ε, Θ, Ο, Σ, and Φ have a round shape. The letters Δ, Ε, Θ, Ο, and especially Ψ in cruciform, are of the form characteristic for the late uncial script. Φ is large and bevelled at both ends. The letters were written by an 'elegant and careful' hand.

The nomina sacra (or sacred names) are written in an abbreviated way: ΘΣ for θεος, ΙΣ for Ιησους, ΧΣ for χριστος, ΚΣ for κυριος, ΥΣ for υιος, ΣΗΡ for σωτηρ, ΣΡΑ for σωτηρια, ΣΡΙΟΣ for σωτηριος, ΟΥΝΟΣ for ουρανος, ΟΥΝΙΟΣ for ουρανιος, ΠΝΑ for πνευμα, ΠΗΡ for πατηρ, ΜΗΡ for μητηρ, ΑΝΟΣ for ανθρωπος, ΣΤΡΣ for σταυρος, ΔΑΔ for δαβιδ, ΙΗΛ for ισραηλ, ΙΛΗΜ for ιερουσαλημ, etc. The words at the end of lines are sometimes abbreviated too. It uses typographic ligatures.

The codex has a lot of grammar errors, like hiatus (e.g. νηστευουσιν in Matthew 9:14, ελεγεν in Matthew 9:21, ειπεν in Matthew 9:22, etc.) and N ephelkystikon. The error of iotacism occurs infrequently.

The breathings (rough and smooth breathing) and accents (see e.g. Greek diacritics) are given fully and usually correctly. The breathings are indicated by sigla ⊢ and ⊣, often used in codices from the 9th and 10th century. In some cases breathings are given incorrectly (e.g. Matthew 9,7.16).

The text is divided according to the Ammonian Sections, with the usual number of sections, are written on the left margin, but there are given without references to the Eusebian Canons. The capitals at the beginning of the sections stand out in the margin to indicate new sections (as in codices Alexandrinus, Ephraemi, and Basilensis. It has some lectionary markings at the margin.

The headpieces are decorated, with headings written in gold and red; in some places nicely decorated initial letters can be found (in red or gold). The Ammonian sections are written in red. The pages are numbered; the Greek quire numbers are still found at the top right of some pages. At the top left of the first page of most quires in Gospel of Matthew, Arabic quire numbers are found.

There are several different correctors, among which the "first hand" worked on the codex, but the total number of corrections is not high.

Text 

The Greek text of this codex is a representative of the Byzantine text-type, but with a number of singular readings. According to Bruce M. Metzger it is typical Byzantine text. According to Kurt and Barbara Aland it agrees with the Byzantine standard text 156 times, and 78 times with the Byzantine when it has the same reading as the original text. It does not support the "original" text against the Byzantine. It has 11 independent or distinctive readings. Alands placed it in Category V of New Testament manuscripts. It is not a very important codex, but it is an important witness of the Byzantine text-type. Hermann von Soden classified it as Ki (now it is known as textual family E). According to the Claremont Profile Method it has mixed Byzantine text in Luke 1; in Luke 10 and Luke the manuscript is defective.

Textual variants (against Textus Receptus) 

The words before the bracket are the readings of the Textus Receptus (received text used in the West from the 16th century until the end of the 19th century), the words after are the readings of the codex.

Matthew 9:1 εμβας ] εμβας ο Ιησους (unique reading)
Matthew 9:1 ιδιαν ] υδαιαν
Matthew 9:5 αφεωνται σοι ] αφεωνται σου
Matthew 9:5 εγειραι ] εγειρε
Matthew 9:13 ηλθον ] εληλυθα
Matthew 9:18 αρχων ελθων ] αρχων προσηλθεν τω Ιησου
Matthew 9:18 αυτω λεγων ] αυτω λεγω
Matthew 9:18 οτι η θυγατηρ ] τι η θυγατηρ
Matthew 9:32 εξερχομενων ] διεξερχομενων
Matthew 9:33 οτι ] absent (codices: B C D E G K L S)
Matthew 9:36 εκλελυμενοι ] εσκυλμενοι (codices: B C D E F G K S)
Matthew 10:4 κανανιτης ] κανατης
Matthew 10:5 αποστειλας ] απεστειλεν
Matthew 10:8 νεκρους εγειρετε ] absent (codices: E K L M S)
Matthew 11:7 (also in Matthew 11:8; 11:9) εξελθετε ] εξεληλυθατε (Alexandrian manuscripts have εξελθατε)
Matthew 13:43 ακουετω ] absent
Matthew 13:54 εκπληττεσθαι ] εκπλησεσθαι
Matthew 14:19 και λαβων ] λαβων (codices: B D E F K L M P S)
Matthew 14:22 τους οχλους ] τον οχλον (later hand corrected into τους οχλους)
Matthew 14:23 μονος ] absent
Matthew 14:34 γεννησαρετ ] γενησαρεθ (codices: K L)
Matthew 15:4 σου ] absent (codices: B D E F G S)
Matthew 15:14 πεσουνται ] εμπεσουνται
Matthew 15:36 μαθηταις ] ματαις (corrected by several later hands)
Matthew 16:3 μεν ] absent
Matthew 16:27 την πραξιν ] τα εργα
Matthew 16:28 των ωδε εστηκοτων ] ωδε εστωτες
Matthew 17:9 απο ] εκ (B C D E F H K L M S)
Matthew 18:14 υμων ] μου (B H)
Matthew 18:8 σκανδαλιζει ] σκανδαλιζη
Matthew 19:5 προσκολληθησεται ] κοληθησεται (κολληθησεται B D F G H S)
Matthew 19:18 Ιησους ] absent
Matthew 21:30 δευτερω ] ετερω (D E F H K)
Matthew 22:24 αναστησει ] εξαναστησει (F G)
Matthew 22:37 ειπεν ] εφη (B D E F G K L M S)
Matthew 23:25 ακρασιας ] αδικιας (C E F G H K S)
Matthew 23:27 absent ] τοις ανθρωποις
Matthew 23:33 πως φυγητε απο της κρισεως της γεεννης ] πως φυγητε της κρισεως της γεεννης
Matthew 26:15 καγω ] και εγω
Matthew 26:17 πασχα ] πασα
Matthew 26:26 ευλογησας ] ευχαριστησας (A E F H K M S)
Matthew 26:33 εγω ουδεποτε σκανδαλισθησομαι ] εγω ουδεποτε σκανδαλισθησομαι εν σοι
Matthew 26:40 τω πετρω ] αυτοις (F K M)
Matthew 27:17 πιλατος ] πηλατος
Matthew 27:41 πρεσβυτερων ] πρεσβυτερων και φαρισαιων (E F K M S)
Matthew 28:13 οι μαθηται αυτου νυκτος ελθοντες εκλεψαν αυτον, ημων κοιμωμενων ] ημων κοιμωμενων οι ματηται αυτου ελθοντες εκλεψαν αυτον
Matthew 27:55 τω Ιησου ] αυτου
Mark 1:9 ναζαρετ ] ναζαρεθ
Mark 1:16 βαλλοντας ] αμφιβαλλοντας (A B D F G H L S)
Mark 2:9 κραββατον ] κραβαττον
Mark 4:3 σπειραι ] σπειραι τον σπορον αυτου (unique reading)
Mark 5:6 προσεκυνεσεν ] προσεπεσεν
Mark 6:23 ωμοσεν ] ωμολογησεν
Mark 7:3 κρατουντες την παραδοσιν των πρεσβυτερων ] κρατουντες των πρεσβυτερων
Mark 9:1 εως αν ιδωσι την βασιλειαν του θεου ] εως αν ιδωσι την βασιλειαν του θεου
Mark 9:8 Ιησουν μονον μεθ' εαυτων ] Ιησουν μεθ' εαυτων
Mark 9:43 (the same in Mark 9:45) εις την γεενναν, εις το πυρ το ασβεστον ] εις τεν γεενναν του πυρος
Mark 9:47 εις την γεενναν, εις το πυρ το ασβεστον ] εις το πυρ το ασβεστον
Mark 10:26 οι δε περισσως εξεπλησσοντο ] οι δε εξεπλησσοντο
Mark 12:28 εις των γραμματεων ] εις γραμματεων
Luke 1:64 ανεωχθη δε το στομα αυτου ] ανεωχθη δε και το στομα αυτου
Luke 1:78 δια σπλαγχνα ελεους θεου ημων ] absent
Luke 7:47 αφεωνται ] αφιονται
Luke 8:2 δαιμονια επτα εξεληλυθει ] δαιμονια εξεληλυθει
Luke 8:22 αυτος ανεβη ] αυτος ο Ιησους ανεβη
Luke 8:30 επηρωτησε ] επερωτησε (lack of augmentum)
Luke 9:45 περι του ρηματος τουτου ] περι τουτου
Luke 9:46 εισηλθεν δε διαλογισμος ] εισηλθεν διαλογισμος
Luke 10:13 και σποδω ] absent
John 2:3 υστερησαντος ] οιστερησαντος
John 9:1 ειδεν ] ο ις ειδεν (G H)
John 10:8 προ εμου ] absent
John 13:17 αποκρινεται ο ιξσους εκεινος εστιν ] absent

Against Kr 
The words before the bracket are the readings of the Kr (traditional text used in Constantinople and still used by Eastern Orthodox Church), the words after are the readings of the codex.

John 5:44 ανθρωπων ] αλληλων
John 5:46 εμου γαρ ] γαρ εμου
John 6:2 ηκολουθει ] ηκολουθησεν
John 6:5 αγορασομεν ] αγορασωμεν
John 6:10 αναπεσον ] αναπεσαν
John 10:8 ηλθον προ εμου ] ηλθον

History 

H. Deane, a paleographer, in 1876 dated the manuscript to the 8th century, Tischendorf and Gregory to the 9th century; Doedes and Tregelles to the 10th century. As of 1995, it is dated by the Institute for New Testament Textual Research (INTF) to the 9th century.

The Codex Boreelianus is named after Johann Boreel (1577–1629), Dutch Ambassador at the Court of James I of England. There is no record of Boreel's obtaining the codex, but it is generally believed that he brought it to the Netherlands from one of his travels to the Middle East. The connection to Boreel is indicated by Wettstein, who was given a partial collation of the codex in 1730. The collation was made by Izaak Verburg, rector of the Amsterdam gymnasium, and contained text from Matthew 7:2 to Luke 11. Wettstein adds that he was not aware of its current location. Wettstein cited the codex in his Novum Testamentum Graecum (1751), also in these parts, which do not survive to the present day (e.g. Matthew 7:9). 
Wettstein designated the codex by siglum F, Gregory designated it by 09 (because number of New Testament manuscripts increased), von Soden gave for it siglum ε 86.

After Johann Boreel's death in 1629, the codex itself was in private hands. Boreel's library was sold in 1632, but the manuscript may not have been among the items for sale. It could have remained in the possession of Boreel's family, for example, in the hands of his younger brother, the theologian Adam Boreel (1602–54). On folio 168 recto of the codex is written the monogram NLB with date "February 9, 1756". On pages 40 recto and 40 verso Dutch notes can found, but they are almost illegible.

The codex resurfaced almost two centuries later, in 1823, and was identified as the Boreelianus by the Utrecht professor Jodocus Heringa (1765–1840). Its leaves had become disordered, and some of them were lost. Scrivener even stated: "Few manuscripts have fallen into such unworthy hands". The manuscript was now in the private hands of Johannes Michaelis Roukens in Arnhem. In a letter of 11 March 1830 Roukens explained that the manuscript had been in the possession of his father, Arend Anton Roukens, who had inherited it from his father, Johannes Michaelis Roukens.

In 1841 Tischendorf wanted to see and examine the codex, but he was allowed to read only Heringa's papers on it  because Heringa was preparing his collation. Heringa's papers were edited and published by Vinke in 1843 under the title Jodoci Heringa El. Fil. Disputatio de codice Boreeliano, nunc Rheno-Trajectino ab ipso in lucem protracto, which includes a full and exact collation of the text.

In 1850 Samuel Prideaux Tregelles, though with some difficulty, examined the codex.

Philipp Schaff in Introduction to the American Edition of Westcott-Hort (1881) wrote that it is not an important manuscript. The same opinion gave biblical scholar Frederic G. Kenyon, according to whom the text of the codex has "comparatively little authority". Despite these opinions, the codex continues to be cited in critical editions of Novum Testamentum Graece. Edition of Nestle-Aland cited the codex from its first verse – i.e. Matthew 9:1 – in critical apparatus.

Since 1830, the codex has been located in the library of the Utrecht University (Ms. 1). In March 2007 David Trobisch visited Utrecht and viewed the manuscript with a number of colleagues. In October 2007 the manuscript was digitized.

See also 
 List of New Testament uncials
 Textual criticism
 Biblical commentary

References

Further reading

External links

Images of Codex Boreelianus 

 Digital facsimile of the Codex Boreelianus at the Special Collections of the Utrecht University

Articles on Codex Boreelianus 
 Description and History of the Manuscript, by Bart Jaski of the Utrecht University
 
 Codex Boreelianus Rheno-Trajectinus (F 09). A Fresh Look after 160 Years
 Codex Boreelianus Revisited

Greek New Testament uncials
9th-century biblical manuscripts